The de Havilland Aircraft Museum, formerly the de Havilland Aircraft Heritage Centre, is a volunteer-run aviation museum in London Colney, Hertfordshire, England. 

The collection is built around the definitive prototype and restoration shops for the de Havilland Mosquito and also includes several examples of the de Havilland Vampire – the third operational jet aircraft in the world. The museum is the largest such museum devoted to one manufacturer in the country.

History

Salisbury Hall

The site has been occupied by a number of large manor houses since the 9th century. The present house was built around 1668 by the London banker James Hoare, bringing with it associations with Charles II and Nell Gwynne, who lived in a cottage by the bridge to the Hall. The Hall subsequently passed through various hands, and during the latter part of the 19th century was occupied by a succession of farmers. However, about 1905 Lady Randolph Churchill, as Mrs Cornwallis West, came here to live. Her son, Winston Churchill, became a regular visitor.

During the 1930s, Sir Nigel Gresley, of the London and North Eastern Railway, was in residence. It is believed that the locomotive was named after the ducks in the moat.

In September 1939, the de Havilland Aircraft Company established the Mosquito design team in the Hall, the prototype Mosquito, E0234/W4050, subsequently being built in the adjacent buildings, to the side of Salisbury Hall. Which have since been demolished. 

After the acquisition of Airspeed Ltd by de Havilland Aircraft Company Airspeed Ltd assembled a design team, headed by aircraft designer Hessell Tiltman. Tiltman's design efforts were initially carried out at the de Havilland technical school at Hatfield, Hertfordshire, before relocating to Salisbury Hall, London Colney. The Airspeed building were behind Salisbury Hall and have since been demolished. Part of the site of the former Airspeed Ltd building was is now covered by the new Geoffrey de Havilland Hangar.

Nell Gwynne's cottage, meanwhile, was the centre of a silk worm farm, which supplied the silk for the Queen's wedding and Coronation robes. 

After de Havilland left in 1947 the Hall slipped into a derelict condition.

When Walter Goldsmith, a retired army major, purchased Salisbury Hall, he soon came to realise that it had been used by de Havilland during the war. On contacting Bill Baird, then in charge of PR at de Havilland at Hatfield, he discovered that the company had used it as the design centre for the Mosquito, and that Baird had squirrelled the original prototype away in the Fiddlebridge stores, just off the airfield at Hatfield. Having resisted several calls to burn the aircraft, Baird was delighted to find someone who could offer the old aircraft a home. de Havilland carried out basic restoration work at Hatfield, and Goldsmith accepted the aircraft back at Salisbury Hall in 1959.

Prototype Mosquito
The prototype Mosquito became the first aircraft to be displayed at Salisbury Hall, and was followed by examples of the de Havilland Vampire and Venom in 1968. In 1970, the collection was joined by a further example of the de Havilland Mosquito, which had been donated by Liverpool Corporation, following its use in the film Mosquito Squadron.

The collection was later expanded, with examples of the single-seat Vampire, Sea Venom, Sea Vixen, Chipmunk and Dove all arriving by 1978. Additionally, the fuselage of a Mosquito FB6 arrived in 1976; it is now the only survivor of the most numerous sub-type to be preserved in Europe. The museum houses the fuselage of the last surviving square-windowed de Havilland Comet 1, the world's first jet airliner.

Later history
The supporters' society has been responsible for the restoration and conservation of many of the exhibits, starting with the Chipmunk in 1978, an airframe which was subsequently restored by members once more between 2003 and 2007. The supporters were also active in building a hangar to house the ex-Liverpool Mosquito in 1980, and then completely restoring the aircraft, a task they completed in 1990. The supporters' society has also been responsible for work on a Tiger Moth, Hornet Moth, Mosquito 6, Heron, Dove, several Vampires and many other aircraft in the collection.

In 2001, it was recognised that the prototype Mosquito was in dire need of conservation work. This work was supported by BAE Systems. and the Heritage Lottery fund. The prototype Mosquito restoration was completed in December 2015 almost to the minute of its 75th anniversary. It is now on display with the other two Mosquitos in the Walter Goldsmith Hangar.

In January 2016 the museum opened a new hangar initially named the Geoffrey de Havilland Hangar. This hangar was later renamed the Amy Johnson Hangar when the new hangar opened and is now used for workshops where the public can see the volunteers working on museum projects.

The museum opened the new Sir Geoffrey de Havilland Hangar in February 2020.

Collection

Aircraft on display

 Airspeed Horsa I/II BAPC.232 – Composite fuselage
 British Aerospace 146-100 G-JEAO – Fuselage only
 Cierva C.24 G-ABLM – On permanent loan from the Science Museum
 de Havilland DH.53 Humming Bird J7326 – Fuselage only
 de Havilland DH.82 Tiger Moth G-ANRX
 de Havilland DH.82 Queen Bee LF789 – Fuselage only
 de Havilland DH.87 Hornet Moth G-ADOT
 de Havilland DH.88 Comet G-ACSR – Replica
 de Havilland DH.98 Mosquito FB.VI TA122/TW233
 de Havilland DH.98 Mosquito TT(B)35 TA634
 de Havilland DH.100 Vampire FB.6 J-1008
 de Havilland DH.103 Hornet VX250 – Tail section
 de Havilland DH.104 Dove 8 G-AREA
 de Havilland DH.106 Comet 1A F-BGNX – Fuselage only
 de Havilland DH.106 Comet 1A G-ANAV – Nose section
 de Havilland DH.106 Comet C.2(R) XK695 – Cockpit section
 de Havilland DH.106 Comet 2 – Nose section
 de Havilland DH.110 Sea Vixen FAW.2 XJ565
 de Havilland DH.114 Heron G-AOTI
 de Havilland DH.115 Vampire T.11 XJ772
 de Havilland DH.125 Series 1 G-ARYC
 de Havilland Canada DHC-1 Chipmunk T.10 WP790
 Hawker Siddeley HS.121 Trident 2E G-AVFH

Aircraft in storage

 de Havilland DH.98 Mosquito TT.35 TJ118 – Fuselage, with nose section removed.
 de Havilland DH.100 Vampire FB.5 VV217
 de Havilland DH.104 Dove 6 D-IFSB – On loan to ARG Fishburn
 de Havilland DH.112 Venom FB.4 WR539
 de Havilland DH.112 Venom FB.50 J-1632
 de Havilland DH.112 Venom FB.54 J-1790
 de Havilland DH.112 Venom NF.3 WX853
 de Havilland DH.113 Vampire NF.10 WM729 – fuselage pod only
 de Havilland DH.125 Jet Dragon G-ARYA – Cockpit section only

Aircraft under restoration

 de Havilland DH.89A Dragon Rapide G-AKDW
 de Havilland DH.98 Mosquito I W4050
 de Havilland DH.112 Sea Venom FAW.22 XG730

Engines on display

Piston engines

 de Havilland Gipsy
 de Havilland Gipsy Major
 de Havilland Gipsy Minor
 de Havilland Gipsy Queen
 de Havilland Gipsy Twelve
 Rolls-Royce Merlin

Gas turbine engines

 de Havilland Ghost
 de Havilland Goblin
 de Havilland Gyron
 de Havilland Gyron Junior
 Rolls-Royce Gnome

Rocket engines

 de Havilland Super Sprite
 de Havilland Spectre

See also

 List of aerospace museums

References

Notes

Bibliography 
 Ellis, Ken. Wrecks and Relics - 19th Edition, Midland Publishing, Hinckley, Leicestershire. 2004.

External links

Official website
Photogallery on LeteckeMotory.cz

Aerospace museums in England
De Havilland
Military aviation museums in England
Museums in Hertfordshire
Museums established in 1959
1959 establishments in England
Shenley